William Francis Gibbs (August 24, 1886 – September 6, 1967) was an American naval architect of the mid twentieth century. Though he began his career as an attorney, after World War I, he became recognized as a skilled project manager in the restoration of a former German ocean liner for American use.  In 1922, in partnership with his brother Frederic Herbert Gibbs, he began the firm which would eventually become Gibbs & Cox; they were among the major designers of World War II era warships and cargo vessels, including the Liberty ships and Fletcher-class destroyers.  Gibbs was a pioneer in the areas of efficient hull design and propulsion, along with being an staunch advocate for high standards of fire prevention and hull integrity.  Although the Liberty ships were designed with a priority of production simplicity and economy, other Gibbs designs tended to be sturdy, light, fast, safe, and enduring.

In the late 1940s and early 1950s the Gibbs brothers were among the promoters leading the United States government and military to subsidize the cost of building the ultimate ocean liner. In the end Gibbs and Cox was awarded the contract to design and supervise the building of SS United States, which entered service in 1952. While in the class of the largest liners, it was much lighter and considerably faster than contemporary vessels. It was built with a high emphasis on safety, using a minimum of flammable materials.

Early years 

Gibbs was born in Philadelphia to financier William Warren Gibbs and Frances Ayres (Johnson) Gibbs. He graduated from the DeLancey School in 1905 then entered Harvard College where he followed his own curriculum of science and engineering, studying plans of British battleships in his dormitory room. He left without a degree in 1910. He then attended Columbia Law School from 1911 to 1913, receiving a Bachelor of Law and Master of Arts in economics, both in 1913. At his father's request, he practiced law for the next two years.

The design had progressed to a point that he left the law firm in May 1915; in January 1916 the brothers presented their plans to Admiral David W. Taylor and Secretary of the Navy Josephus Daniels. The response was encouraging, and the brothers, with the financial backing of J. P. Morgan and the United States Navy, then approached the International Mercantile Marine Company (IMMC) later that year. Although a model was tested in the Experimental Model Basin at the Washington Navy Yard, World War I put an end to these early designs. Gibbs became Chief of Construction for IMMC in 1919.

Gibbs & Cox 

In February 1922 the Gibbs brothers started their own naval architecture firm, Gibbs Brothers, Inc.; their first major contract was to convert the former German liner Vaterland into the American luxury liner . When shipbuilders Blohm + Voss asked over $1 million for the original plans, Gibbs decided to draw his own. Between 100 and 150 draftsmen documented the existing ship and designed its new layout. Gibbs Brothers was renamed Gibbs & Cox in 1929.

Malolo was built at William Cramp & Sons under the Gibbs Brothers' exacting supervision and tolerances. At the time she was launched, Malolo was the largest and fastest passenger liner built in the United States.

All nine of these ships served as U.S. troopships in the war.

During the war, Gibbs & Cox created plans for thousands of American warships and cargo vessels, including destroyers, LST landing craft, minesweepers, tankers, cruisers, and Liberty ships. Between 1940 through 1946, 63 per cent of all merchant ships of 2,000 tons up and 74 per cent of all American naval vessels (destroyers, landing craft, escort carriers, etc.) were built to the designs or working plans of Gibbs & Cox.

After the war, the Gibbs brothers were among the promoters for the US government and military to subsidize the construction and operation of a new 1,000-foot ocean liner. This ship was the culmination of Gibbs career, and he was fastidious in the incorporation of fire safety concepts, to the point that the United States surpassed most present day passenger ships in fire prevention and containment. The design was also revolutionary in the use of lightweight materials and construction techniques, including a welded hull and aluminum superstructure. While rivaling the largest liners for physical size, she was much lighter, enabling higher speeds.

The United States entered service in 1952, after five years of design and 28 months of construction. On her maiden voyage, she won the Blue Riband as the fastest ship to cross the Atlantic Ocean, averaging , and reducing the crossing time by 10 hours. Between 1952 and 1969, the ship completed 400 voyages, with an excellent safety record. She was the largest liner ever built in the United States and the fastest liner built anywhere. While fast and safe, she was panned by some passengers, as the use of exclusively fireproof materials in the décor and furnishings limited the aesthetic and luxury appeal.

In remarks accepting the Franklin Medal for his work in designing the United States, after recounting the ship's many achievements and the efforts of so many in making those achievements possible, Gibbs stated "My sole contribution in this performance is the fact that I took the responsibility for failure."

Later years 

In 1953 Gibbs was awarded the Franklin Institute's Franklin Medal. In 1955 he was awarded the first Elmer A. Sperry Award. He died in New York City on September 6, 1967, two weeks after his 81st birthday.

Fulton-Gibbs Hall, the marine engineering building at the United States Merchant Marine Academy at Kings Point, New York, is named in honor or Gibbs, along with Robert Fulton. The Gibbs Brothers Medal, awarded by the United States National Academy of Sciences for outstanding contributions in the field of naval architecture and marine engineering, was established by a gift from Gibbs and his brother.

References

Further reading
 
 

1886 births
1967 deaths
Harvard College alumni
Columbia Law School alumni
Engineers from Pennsylvania
American naval architects
Burials at Princeton Cemetery
Benjamin Franklin Medal (Franklin Institute) laureates